John Jones (1818 – 1898), also known as Ioan Bryngwyn Bach and Y Seryddwr (The Astronomer), was a Welsh amateur astronomer.

He was born at Bryngwyn Bach, Dwyran, Anglesey, and received only an elementary education.  From the age of twelve, he worked as a farm labourer. He later worked as a counter of cargoes of slate as they were loaded on to ships in Bangor, in modern Gwynedd.  Unusually for someone of his background, he was not only a musician and a poet but proficient in several languages.  He is noted mainly for his interest in astronomy: he constructed his own telescopesincluding "Jumbo", reputed to be the first silver-on-glass reflecting telescope in Wales.

He died at Bangor in 1898.

Recognition 
Jones was praised by Samuel Smiles in his 1884 book Men of Invention and Industry. In 2004, he was voted No. 94 in a poll of 100 Welsh Heroes organised by the BBC. A plaque in his honour has been erected by Ynys Môn County Council at Brynsiencyn.

References

Welsh astronomers
Amateur astronomers
19th-century British astronomers
1818 births
Date of birth missing
1898 deaths
Date of death missing
People from Anglesey